Women Against Violence Europe (WAVE) is a non-profit feminist women's organization which was established in 1994 and has its headquarters in Vienna, Austria. It is the only European network focused exclusively on the elimination of violence against women and children, and it lobbies state governments and relevant bodies of the Council of Europe at the EU level to gain sustainability of women's services. In keeping with the aims of the United Nations, WAVE highlights ending all forms of violence against women and children in both public and private life, following document such as the Vienna Declaration, the Declaration on Violence Against Women and the Beijing Platform for Action. The current executive director of Women Against Violence Europe is Stephanie Futter-Orel.

Background and history 

The inspiration for WAVE began in 1993 at the World Conference on Human Rights, which was held in Vienna. The conference explicitly named violence against women as a violation of human rights, which was outlined in the resulting Vienna Declaration. The Declaration defined violence against women, and called for states to take concrete steps to prevent it. Following this, the United Nations General Assembly (UNGA) adopted the Declaration on the Elimination of Violence Against Women in December 1993. In October 1994, women gathered at the Vienna NGO Forum to prepare for the 4th UN Conference on Women in Beijing, where the idea of creating a European network dedicated to eliminating violence against women appeared. At the Beijing Conference from September 4 until 15 1995, progress was made on forming the network and initiators ran a working group, with the Platform for Action being developed as a result. The WAVE founding group held its constituent session during the World Conference and, in October 1996, WAVE held its first networking session in Utrecht. The group was originally named the “Information Centre Against Violence” before changing its title to “Women Against Violence” and then “Women Against Violence Europe”.

The organization's first meeting took place at the Intervention Centre Against Domestic Violence in Vienna in December 1996, and in 1997 WAVE held its first conference in Belgrade, Serbia. WAVE's work has been supported by the European Commission since 1997. In 2014, WAVE became a legal entity in Austria.

Organization structure

WAVE Network Members 
WAVE consists of various European women's NGOs who seek to combat violence against women and children. There are currently over 150 members supported by WAVE who work at national level in 46 European countries. Members include network organizations, single organizations and individuals. Each country is represented by the delegate and co-delegate of their choice.

Board members 
The WAVE board includes up to eight members serving for two years. Since January 2019, Pille Tsopp-Pagan and Marcella Pirrone have been serving as president and vice president accordingly.

Advisory board members 
The advisory board is meant to support the Board with strategic advice by bringing issues arising in their home countries and therefore the AB is meant to ensure there is representation from all regions and help the Office to work closely with members during the bi-annual meetings. The advisory board is composed of a representative of each country in which WAVE is present.

Office 
The WAVE Office Team serves as a point of contact between the involved women's organizations in Europe. Main functions include the collection and dissemination of data on women's support services (WSS) and any applicable legal provisions, creation of prevention programs, campaigns and international activities. The office is involved in advocacy work at the European and national level, producing publications and organizing relevant activities. The current executive director of Women Against Violence Europe is Stephanie Futter-Orel.

Principles 
The network's aims are to promote and strengthen the human rights of women and children, specifically by preventing violence against these groups, and to eliminate all forms of violence against women in order to attain gender equality. WAVE seeks to reach these goals by empowering other organizations fighting for women's rights, especially those providing direct services and aid to women impacted by violence.

Main Activities 
1.	Advocacy

2.	Capacity building of women specialist services (WSS)

3.	Exchange of information

4.	Research

5.	Networking

Key programs/Initiatives

Step Up! Campaign 
This is a European-wide WAVE campaign, which is meant to increase efforts to end violence against women, raise awareness of the issue, mobilize for the rights of women and children to live free from violence and protect female survivors of such violence. It recognizes the Istanbul Convention as the most powerful legal tool in Europe to promote its aims and considers knowledge and education key elements to its program's success.

The WAVE Youth Ambassadors 
The WAVE Youth Ambassadors support the Step Up! Campaign since October 2018 and are nominated every two years. All their actions revolve around raising awareness towards a young target about violence against woman and girls. The group usually consists of around 10 to 15 young people (age 18–27) from the participating campaigning countries.

Civil Society Strengthening Platform (CSSP) 
CSSP aims to build women's voices and agency at a regional level. It is meant to increase the capacity of women's organizations’ platforms and networks as a tool to support women's civic engagement in CEDAW and Istanbul Convention monitoring and reporting. It is part of a 3-year program funded by the European Commission and UN Women called “Implementing Norms, Changing Minds”.

CYBERSAFE Project 
It is a European project meant to prevent cyber violence towards women and girls. Part of the project has included developing a game which allows young people to understand the risks associated with cyber violence. WAVE is participating in the project with partners from 8 EU countries.

TISOVA 
A European Erasmus+ program started in September 2017, it is meant to establish partnerships between senior centers and their involved partner country. It utilizes an interactive training program to educate key groups on violence enacted against the elderly.

WHOSEFVA 
This is a two-year project funded by the European Commission under its “Rights, Equality and Citizenship” program. It aims to address existing barriers and gaps in healthcare systems so that it can provide support to elderly women who are experiencing or have experienced abuse. To date, it has been implemented in six partner countries.

MARVOW 
MARVOW Project is the European project, which consists of 6 partners, with the support of 9 associate partners, in 4 European countries. It will develop comprehensive multiagency cooperation model for working with elderly victims of abuse. MARVOW will also assist with implementation, intervention and work with perpetrators.

DIS.CO 
This program was meant to provide educational and vocational training for counseling professionals working with women victims of violence and/or abuse from a distance. It was a two-year Erasmus+ program.

Funding 

The WAVE Network is largely funded by the Operating Grant given by the European Union and other grants, including OAK Foundation, UN Women, Open Society Foundation, Federal Ministry, Labour, Social Affairs, Health and Consumer Protection, Federal Minister for women, families and youth, Frauen Stadt Wien MA57. WAVE also receives funding from an annual membership fee.

Publications 

Every other year since 2008, WAVE has been publishing the so-called Country Reports. The Country Reports inform about the situation of women's specialist support services in Europe. As a guideline to measure progress and deficits the standards defined in the Istanbul Convention is being used. The extensive data collection gives insight into the accessibility and operation of national women's helplines, women's shelters, women's centers and specialist services for survivors of sexualized violence in Europe. The country profiles give detailed information about the status of each country of the large majority of European states (46 states).  Data is collected by an online questionnaire that fulfill minimum standards for data collection required by the Istanbul Convention. Data are collected directly from WAVE Country Delegates every two years.

Furthermore, WAVE publishes audiovisuals, a bi-monthly newsletter, policy and thematic papers, research reports and training manuals. There is also the WAVE blog, WAVE fact sheets and WAVE statistics, all accessible through the main website. WAVE publishes a magazine called Fempower, whose articles appear on the WAVE blog.  In April 2020 WAVE inaugurated a podcast series called “What the WAVE?” during the COVID-19 pandemic. The podcast is thought to be an alternative informative source from a feminist angle and features inspirational stories of feminist icons. The podcast is advertised on WAVE's social media. WAVE spreads its information on Instagram, Facebook and Twitter.

Events 
WAVE hosts an annual conference whose theme and location change every year:

2020 – “Structural inequality: the root of the global pandemic of violence against women” (Online conference)

2019 – “25 Years of Defending Women’s Human Rights: Milestones and Visions for the Future” (Tallinn, Estonia)

2018 – “The Importance of Women’s Specialist Services in Tackling Violence Against Women” (Valletta, Malta)

2017 – “From Backlash to Effective Response: Step Up Together for the Protection of Women and Girls from all Forms of Violence” (Budapest, Hungary)

2016 – “Step Up Europe – Unite to End Violence Against Women and Their Children” (Berlin, Germany)

2015 – “Women’s Collective Strength to Stop Violence! Conference to Strengthen the WAVE Network” (The Hague, The Netherlands)

2014 – “Further Perspectives on Preventing Violence Against Women and Their Children” (Vienna, Austria)

2013 – “To Live Free from Violence – A Human Right for Women and Their Children or a Postcode Lottery?” (Sofia, Bulgaria)

2012 – “Whose Voices? Whose Needs? Whose Decisions?” (London, England)

2011 – “Strengthening the Efforts to prevent Violence against Women and their Children in Europe and in the Mediterranean Region” (Rome, Italy)

2010 – “Europe United: Ending Violence Against Women – Towards Better Laws, Policies and Support Services” (Warsaw, Poland)

2009 – “Stop Violence Against Women and Children” (Vienna, Austria)

2008 – “Role of Women’s NGOs in Preventing and Eliminating Violence Against Women” (Košice, Slovakia)

2007 – “Stop Domestic Violence Against Women” (Vilnius, Lithuania)

2006 – (Lisbon, Portugal)

2005 – (Copenhagen, Denmark) **held with LOKK

2004 – (Vienna, Austria)

2003 – “Wave violence goodbye! New strategies from a feminist perspective” (Dunajská Streda, Slovakia)

WAVE also conducts training workshops and study visits for member countries.

See also 
•	Civil Society Strengthening Platform (CSSP)

•	DIS.CO

•	Fempower Magazine

•	Step-Up Campaign – Youth Ambassadors

•	TISOVA

•	WAVE Blog

•	WHOSEFVA

•	MARVOW

•	CYBERSAFE

References 

1994 establishments in Austria
International nongovernmental organizations
Violence against women in Europe